The ARY Film Award for Best Cinematography is an ARY Film Award that is awarded each year to a cinematographer for work in one particular motion picture. It is one of eleven Technical Awarding category.

History
The Best Cinematography category originates with the 1st ARY Film Awards ceremony since 2014. This category has been given to the best Cinematographer for his/her work for the films of previous year to the ceremony held by Jury selection.

Winners and Nominees

As of 2014, No nominations were made, winner selection and nomination were wholly made by AFAS Jury of Technical award.

2010s

References

External links 

 ARY Film Awards Official website

ARY Film Award winners
ARY Film Awards
Awards for best cinematography